The Koreans were an English four-piece indie rock band from London, England, active between 1998 and 2004. Their music has featured in the HBO television series Entourage, The O.C. and the Juiced video game soundtrack.

Discography

Albums
65 Sutherland Square, 1999 released via Chlorine Records
Dull Diamonds And Polished Stones, 2001 released via Chlorine Records
Neon, 13/09/2004 released via Storm Music

EPs
Slow Motion EP, 1998 released via Chlorine Records
Listen Carefully..., 1999 released via Chlorine Records

Singles
"Machine Code", 21/07/2003 released via Drowned in Sound
"How Does It Feel", 01/12/2003 released via Drowned in Sound - BBC 6 Music Single Of The Week
"Still Strung Out", 09/08/2004 released via Storm Music - Virgin Radio Single Of The Week

References

External links

English indie rock groups
Musical groups from London